Rožar (Istro-Venetian: Rosariòl) is a small village in the City Municipality of Koper in the Littoral region of Slovenia.

The local church is dedicated to Saint George and belongs to the Parish of Predloka.

References

External links

Rožar on Geopedia

Populated places in the City Municipality of Koper